Bactrian is an extinct Eastern Iranian language formerly spoken in the Central Asian region of Bactria (in present-day Afghanistan) and used as the official language of the Kushan and the Hephthalite empires.

Name
It was long thought that Avestan represented "Old Bactrian", but this notion had "rightly fallen into discredit by the end of the 19th century".

It has also been known by names such as Greco-Bactrian, Kushan or Kushano-Bactrian.

Under Kushan rule, Bactria became known as Tukhara or Tokhara, and later as Tokharistan. When texts in two extinct and previously unknown Indo-European languages were discovered in the Tarim Basin of China, during the early 20th century, they were linked circumstantially to Tokharistan, and Bactrian was sometimes referred to as "Eteo-Tocharian" (i.e. "true" or "original" Tocharian). By the 1970s, however, it became clear that there was little evidence for such a connection. For instance, the Tarim "Tocharian" languages were "centum" languages within the Indo-European family, whereas Bactrian was an Iranian, thus "satem" language.

Classification
Bactrian is a part of the Eastern Iranian languages, and shares features with the extinct Middle Iranian languages Sogdian and Khwarezmian (Eastern) and Parthian (Western), as well as sharing affinity with the modern Eastern Iranian languages such as Pashto and Pamir languages like Munji-Yidgha languages. Its genealogical position is unclear. According to another source, the present-day speakers of Munji, the modern Eastern Iranian language of the Munjan Valley in northeast Afghanistan, display the closest possible linguistic affinity with the Bactrian language.

History

Bactrian became the lingua franca of the Kushan Empire and the region of Bactria, replacing the Greek language. Bactrian was used by successive rulers in Bactria, until the arrival of the Umayyad Caliphate.

Historical development
Following the conquest of Bactria by Alexander the Great in 323 BC, for about two centuries Greek was the administrative language of his Hellenistic successors, that is, the Seleucid and the Greco-Bactrian kingdoms.
Eastern Scythian tribes (the Saka, or Sacaraucae of Greek sources) invaded the territory around 140 BC, and at some time after 124 BC, Bactria was overrun by a confederation of tribes belonging to the Great Yuezhi and Tokhari. In the 1st century AD, the Kushana, one of the Yuezhi tribes, founded the ruling dynasty of the Kushan Empire.

The Kushan Empire initially retained the Greek language for administrative purposes but soon began to use Bactrian. The Bactrian Rabatak inscription (discovered in 1993 and deciphered in 2000) records that the Kushan king Kanishka (c. 127 AD) discarded Greek ("Ionian") as the language of administration and adopted Bactrian ("Arya language"). The Greek language accordingly vanished from official use and only Bactrian was later attested. The Greek script, however, remained and was used to write Bactrian.

The territorial expansion of the Kushans helped propagate Bactrian in other parts of Central Asia and North India.

In the 3rd century, the Kushan territories west of the Indus River fell to the Sasanians, and Bactrian began to be influenced by Middle Persian. The eastern extant of the Kushan Empire in Northwestern India, was conquered by the Gupta Empire. Besides the Pahlavi script and (occasionally) the Brahmi script, some coinage of this period is still in the Aryo (Bactrian) script.

From the mid-4th century, Bactria and northwestern India gradually fell under the control the Hephthalite and other Huna tribes. The Hephthalite period is marked by linguistic diversity; in addition to Bactrian, Middle Persian, Indo-Aryan and Latin vocabulary is also attested. The Hephthalites ruled these regions until the 7th century when they were overrun by the Umayyad Caliphate, after which official use of Bactrian ceased. Although Bactrian briefly survived in other usage, that also eventually ceased, and the latest known examples of the Bactrian script, found in the Tochi Valley in Pakistan, date to the end of the 9th century.

Writing system

Among Indo-Iranian languages, the use of the Greek script is unique to Bactrian. Xi (Ξ, ξ) and psi (Ψ, ψ) were not used for writing Bactrian as the ks and ps sequences did not occur in Bactrian. They were, however, probably used to represent numbers (just as other Greek letters were).

Records

The Bactrian language is known from inscriptions, coins, seals, manuscripts, and other documents.

Sites at which Bactrian language inscriptions have been found are (in north–south order) Afrasiyab in Uzbekistan; Kara-Tepe, Airtam, Delbarjin, Balkh, Kunduz, Baglan, Ratabak/Surkh Kotal, Oruzgan, Kabul, Dasht-e Navur, Ghazni, Jagatu in Afghanistan; and Islamabad, Shatial Bridge and Tochi Valley in Pakistan. 
 Of eight known manuscript fragments in Greco-Bactrian script, one is from Lou-lan and seven from Toyoq, where they were discovered by the second and third Turpan expeditions under Albert von Le Coq. One of these may be a Buddhist text. One other manuscript, in Manichaean script, was found at Qočo by Mary Boyce in 1958.

Over 150 legal documents, accounts, letters and Buddhist texts have surfaced since the 1990s, the largest collection of which is the Khalili Collection of Aramaic Documents. These have greatly increased the detail in which Bactrian is currently known.

Phonology

The phonology of Bactrian is not known with certainty, owing to the limitations of the native scripts.

Consonants

A major difficulty in determining Bactrian phonology is that affricates and voiced stops were not consistently distinguished from the corresponding fricatives in the Greek script.
 Proto-Iranian *b, *d, *g have generally become spirants, as in most other Eastern Iranian languages. Original *d remains only in a few consonant clusters, e.g. *bandaka > βανδαγο 'servant', *dugdā > λογδο 'daughter'.
 Proto-Iranian *p, *t, *č, *k have become voiced between vowels, and after a nasal consonant or *r.
 Inside a word, the digraphs ββ, δδ for original voiceless *p, *t can be found, which probably represent , . The former is attested only in a single word, αββο 'water'. Manichaean Bactrian appears to only have had  in native vocabulary. According to Gholami, instances of single δ may indicate a fricative pronunciation, .
 γ appears to stand for both the stop  and the fricative , but it is unclear if a contrast existed, and which instances are which. Evidence from the Manichaean script suggests that γ from *k may have been  and γ from *g may have been . According to Greek orthographic practices, γγ represents .
This distinction is again confirmed by the Manichaean script. Also a third counterpart of ζ is found in Manichaean Bactrian, possibly representing .

The status of θ is unclear; it only appears in the word ιθαο 'thus, also', which may be a loanword from another Iranian language. In most positions Proto-Iranian *θ becomes  (written υ), or is lost, e.g. *puθra- > πουρο 'son'. The cluster *θw, however, appears to become , e.g. *wikāθwan > οιγαλφο 'witness'.

ϸ continues, in addition to Proto-Iranian *š, also Proto-Iranian *s in the clusters *sr, *str, *rst. In several cases, however, Proto-Iranian *š becomes  or is lost; the distribution is unclear. E.g. *snušā > ασνωυο 'daughter-in-law', *aštā > αταο 'eight', *xšāθriya > χαρο 'ruler', *pašman- > παμανο 'wool'.

Vowels

The Greek script does not consistently represent vowel length. Fewer vowel contrasts yet are found in the Manichaean script, but short  and long  are distinguished in it, suggesting that Bactrian generally retains the Proto-Iranian vowel length contrast.

Short  may have occurred at least as a reflex of *a followed by a lost *u in the next syllable, e.g. *madu > μολο 'wine', *pasu > ποσο 'sheep'. Short  is also rare. By contrast, long ,  are well established as reflexes of Proto-Iranian diphthongs and certain vowel-semivowel sequences: η < *ai, *aya, *iya; ω < *au, *awa.

An epenthetic vowel  (written α) is inserted before word-initial consonant clusters.

Original word-final vowels and word-initial vowels in open syllables were generally lost. A word-final ο is normally written, but this was probably silent, and it is appended even after retained word-final vowels: e.g. *aštā > αταο 'eight', likely pronounced .

The Proto-Iranian syllabic rhotic *r̥ is lost in Bactrian, and is reflected as ορ adjacent to labial consonants, ιρ elsewhere; this agrees with the development in the western Iranian languages Parthian and Middle Persian.

Orthography

Examples

See also
 Kidarites

Notes

References
 Falk (2001): “The yuga of Sphujiddhvaja and the era of the Kuṣâṇas.” Harry Falk. Silk Road Art and Archaeology VII, pp. 121–136.
 Henning (1960): “The Bactrian Inscription.” W. B. Henning. Bulletin of the School of Oriental and African Studies, University of London, Vol. 23, No. 1. (1960), pp. 47–55.
 .
 
 .
 .

External links
Bactrian language at britannica.com

 
Extinct languages of Asia
Languages attested from the 3rd century BC
Languages extinct in the 9th century
Languages of Afghanistan
Languages of Tajikistan
Linguistic history of Pakistan
Eastern Iranian languages